"Same Script, Different Cast" is a song performed as a duet by American and Canadian R&B singers Whitney Houston and Deborah Cox. The song was released as a single in the United States on May 2, 2000, by Arista Records. The song features Houston playing the former lover of Cox's current boyfriend. Houston warns Cox of his hurtful ways, though Cox refuses to acknowledge it.

The song incorporates a backing track of Ludwig van Beethoven's "Für Elise" during the intro. The song was released as a radio-only promo single and hence no video was made. It was a minor hit on Billboard Hot 100, peaking at number 70 while reaching number 14 on Hot R&B/Hip-Hop Songs. The song was also very successful on Hot Dance Club Play, peaking at number 4.

Critical reception 
Jim Farber of New York Daily News wrote: "There's a nice tête- ... -tête with label mate Deborah Cox on "Same Script, Different Cast" which amounts to a grownup version of Brandy and Monica's "The Boy Is Mine" JAM! Music's Jane Stevenson preferred this duet: "Toronto's own Deborah Cox fares better with Houston on Same Script, Different Cast than Enrique Iglesias does on the soppy Could I Have This Kiss Forever (Metro Mix)." USA Today's Steve Jones wrote that this collaboration is "most telling." Billboard called this song a special highlight. The Star-Ledger Newark, NJ wrote: "Same Script, Different Cast" isn't much of a song, but gives Houston and duet partner Deborah Cox an opportunity to engage in some thrilling vocal sparring." Sonic.net editor wrote: "Same Script, Different Cast" features plucked harp strings and piano behind a duet with Deborah Cox, the two singers bemoaning that
they chose the same loser for a lover"; Barnes & Noble called this song my "man done me wrong" pairing. Essence review called this song special gem in which laides trade sassy lines. Vibe Magazine agreed. Orlando Sentinel editor wrote: "Same Script, Different Cast" plays like a conversation in a Broadway musical. In the song, Houston warns her friend that her current boyfriend eventually will break her heart." Reporter. pl agreed when critics claimed that this is one of the most interesting duets in years. The Baltimore Sun panned the song calling it tepid and bloated. Following Houston's death in 2012, Entertainment Weekly published a list of her 25 best songs and ranked "Same Script, Different Cast" at number 24, commenting "If the boy from the Brandy and Monica duet The Boy Is Mine grew up into a cad, burned Whitney, and took up with Deborah Cox."

Track listings and formats 
US 12" Vinyl 2×12-inch 
A: "Same Script, Different Cast" (Jonathan Peters Vocal Club Mix) — 9:35 	
B: "Same Script, Different Cast" (Joe Smooth Slang Club Mix) — 5:49 	
C: "Same Script, Different Cast" (Jonathan Peters Goes There Dub) — 11:07 	
D: "Same Script, Different Cast" (Victor Romeo Slang Vocal Mix) — 6:19

US, UK Dance Vault Mixes (Digital download)
 "Same Script, Different Cast" (Jonathan Peters Vocal Club Mix) — 9:38
 "Same Script, Different Cast" (Joe Smooth Slang Club Mix) — 5:49
 "Same Script, Different Cast" (Mel Hammond Beautiful Slang Dub) — 6:41
 "Same Script, Different Cast" (Friburn & Urik Cover Your Ears Mix) — 10:40
 "Same Script, Different Cast" (Jonathan Peters Goes There Dub) — 11:08
 "Same Script, Different Cast" (Victor Romeo Slang Vocal Mix) — 6:23
 "Same Script, Different Cast" (Jonathan Peters Radio Edit) — 4:20

Personnel 
Recording and mixing
 Recorded by Anne Catalino at Enterprise Studios, LA, CA, & Crescent Moon Studios, Miami, FL
 Mixed by Peter Mokran at Enterprise Studios, LA, CA

Credits
 Written by Stacey Daniels, Shae Jones, Shep Crawford, Montell Jordan
 Produced by Shep Crawford
 Tracked by Anne Catalino at The Hit Factory, NY, NY
 Tracked by Jamie Seyberth at Paramount Recording Studios, Hollywood, CA
 String arrangements conducted by Shep Crawford & Joe Mardin
 Vocal arrangement: Whitney Houston, Shep Crawford & Kelly Price
 Guitar: Jay Williams
 All other instruments: Shep Crawford
 Background vocals: Shep Crawford, Deborah Cox & Shae Jones

Charts

Weekly charts

Year-end charts

References

External links 
Same Script, Different Cast at whitneyhouston.com
Same Script, Different Cast at Discogs

2000s ballads
2000 singles
Deborah Cox songs
Whitney Houston songs
Female vocal duets
Pop ballads
Soul ballads
Contemporary R&B ballads
Songs written by Shep Crawford
2000 songs
Arista Records singles
Songs written by Montell Jordan
Songs written by Shae Jones
Songs about heartache